The 1981 Cornell Big Red football team represented Cornell University in the 1981 NCAA Division I-A football season as a member of the Ivy League.

Schedule

References

Cornell
Cornell Big Red football seasons
Cornell Big Red football